Zatta (also ዛታ) is one of the woredas within the Tigray Region of Ethiopia. Part of the Debubawi Zone. Zatta is bordered with Amhara Region with a river namely Tslare ( ጽላረ) which flows into the Tekezé River. Wereda Zatta contains several monasteries and sacred churches like deqol(ደቆል), St. George, St. Merry, St. Michael. The town of Zatta has Highschool, elementary school, clinic, and scenery in it. The town resides at the bottom of Zatta mountain. 

Zatta is located midway between Korem and Sekota.

References

Populated places in the Tigray Region